Alpine folk music (German's Volksmusik means "people's music" or as a Germanic connotative translation, "folk's music") is the common umbrella designation of a number of related styles of traditional folk music of the Germanosphere, particularly in the Alpine regions of Slovenia, Northern Croatia, Germany, Austria, Switzerland and South Tyrol (Italy).

It tends to be dialect-heavy and invokes local and regional lifestyles, cultures and traditions, particularly, those of the Alpine farmers and peasants.

Originally transmitted by oral tradition, the oldest historical records like the Appenzell Kuhreihen by Georg Rhau (1488–1548) date back to the 16th century. Alpine folk is characterized by improvisation and variation, uncomplicated major key melodies and simple harmonies. Typical instruments range from alpenhorns to hackbretts, zithers and acoustic guitars, and even violas and harmonicas. Harmonized singing is frequent, but other pieces may require yodeling, while instrumental arrangements are particularly frequent for fast dances or brass pieces.

Alpine folk continues to be performed by many local ensembles and bands throughout the European Alps and should not be confused with Volkstümliche Musik, which is largely to be found in broadcasting media and on ancillary merchandise. Since the 1970s, artists of a Neue Volksmusik genre, such as Werner Pirchner or Biermösl Blosn, attempt to combine traditional styles with jazz, folk, electronic music, rock et al. as a kind of world music. Popular proponents include Hubert von Goisern, Attwenger and Christine Lauterburg.

See also
Austrian folk dance
La Lupa, singer and performer from the Alps region
 Michael Bredl (1916–1999), a collector of traditional Swabian and Bavarian Volksmusik

Bibliography
 Marcello Sorce Keller, Tradizione orale e tradizione corale: ricerca musicologica in Trentino, Bologna, Forni Editore, 1991.
 Marcello Sorce Keller, “Gebiete, Schichten und Klanglandschaften in den Alpen. Zum Gebrauch einiger historischer Begriffe aus der Musikethnologie”, in T. Nussbaumer (ed.), Volksmusik in den Alpen: Interkulturelle Horizonte und Crossovers, Zalzburg, Verlag Mueller-Speiser, 2006.
 Marcello Sorce Keller, "Costantino Nigra und die Balladen-Forschung. Betrachtungen über die Beziehung zwischen Nord-Italien, Frankreich und der Suisse Romande". Bulletin. Gesellschaft für die Volksmusik in der Schweiz, X(2011), 33-40.

See also
 Schunkeln (sway dance)
 Music of Germany
 Austrian folk dancing

References

External links
 Volksmusiknet, all about Swiss Volksmusik with 24/7 Nonstop Music-Radio and CD Novelties

German folk music
+